The 1943 Wake Forest Demon Deacons football team was an American football team that represented Wake Forest University during the 1943 college football season. In its seventh season under head coach Peahead Walker, the team compiled a 4–5 record and finished in fourth place in the Southern Conference.

Schedule

References

Wake Forest
Wake Forest Demon Deacons football seasons
Wake Forest Demon Deacons football